The 1974 WAFL season was the 90th season of the various incarnations of senior football in Perth and the forty-fourth as the "Western Australian National Football League". It continued the fluctuating fortunes of clubs that had been part and parcel of the league since 1970, with East Perth, the most consistent player in the competition for eight years, missing finals participation for the only time in seventeen seasons between 1966 and 1982 due largely to injuries to key defenders Gary Malarkey, who missed the second half of the season, and Ken McAullay who did not play at all. West Perth fell from runners-up (after being flag favourites before the Grand Final) to their worst season since 1939, largely owing to the loss of 1973 leading goalkicker Phil Smith which left a gaping hole in their attack.

On the other hand, Swan Districts, with full-forward Max George and big Bob Beecroft prominent, won the Rodriguez Shield for the second time and played finals for the first time since 1965 after eight bleak years that had seen them a kick away from a winless season six seasons previously, whilst East Fremantle made a similar if less abrupt recovery to win their first premiership for nine years and first minor premiership for a decade.

Home-and-away season

Round 1

Round 2 (Easter weekend)

Round 3

Round 4 (Anzac Day)

Round 5

Round 6

Round 7

Round 8

Round 9 (Foundation Day)

Round 10

Round 11

Round 12

Round 13

Round 14

Round 15

Round 16

Round 17

Round 18

Round 19

Round 20

Round 21

Ladder

Finals

First semi-final

Second semi-final

Preliminary final

Grand Final

References

External links
 Official WAFL website
 Western Australian National Football League (WANFL), 1974

West Australian Football League seasons
WANFL